The piano is a keyboard instrument with strings struck by wooden hammers coated with a softer material (modern hammers are covered with dense wool felt; some early pianos used leather). It is played using its keyboard, which is a row of keys (small levers) touched by the performer with the fingers and thumbs of both hands, causing the hammers to strike the strings. It was invented in Italy by Bartolomeo Cristofori around the year 1700.

Description
Variations in volume (loudness) are produced in response to the pianist's touch (pressure on the keys): the greater the pressure, the greater the force of the hammer hitting the strings, and the louder the sound produced and the stronger the attack. Invented in the 1700s, the fortepiano was the first keyboard instrument to allow a quieter sound and greater dynamic range than the harpsichord. Unlike the pipe organ and harpsichord, the piano allows gradations of volume and tone according to how forcefully or softly a performer presses or strikes the keys.

A piano has a protective case surrounding the soundboard and metal strings, strung under great tension on a heavy metal frame. Pressing one or more keys  causes a hammer made of wood or plastic, padded with firm felt, to strike the strings. The hammer then rebounds from the strings, which vibrate at their resonant frequency. The vibrations are transmitted through a bridge to a soundboard that amplifies the sound by coupling the acoustic energy to the air. When the key is released, a damper stops the string's vibration, ending the sound.

Most notes have three strings, except for the bass, which graduates from one to two. The strings are sounded when keys are pressed or struck, and silenced by dampers when the hands are lifted from the keyboard. Although an acoustic piano has strings, it is usually classified as a percussion instrument rather than as a stringed instrument, because the strings are struck rather than plucked (as with a harpsichord or spinet); in the Hornbostel–Sachs system of instrument classification, pianos are considered chordophones. There are two main types of piano: the grand piano and the upright piano. The grand piano has a better sound and gives the player a more precise control of the keys, and is therefore the preferred choice for every situation in which the available floor-space and the budget will allow, as well as often being considered a requirement in venues where skilled pianists will frequently give public performances. The upright piano, which necessarily involves some compromise in both tone and key action compared to a grand piano of equivalent quality, is nevertheless much more widely used, because it occupies less space (allowing it to fit comfortably in a room where a grand piano would be too large) and is significantly less expensive.

Notes can be sustained when the keys are released by the use of pedals at the base of the instrument, which hold the dampers off of the strings. The sustain pedal enables pianists to play musical passages that would otherwise be impossible, such as sounding a chord in the bass register and then shifting both hands to the treble range to play a melody and arpeggios over the top of this sustained chord.

Most modern pianos have a row of 88 black and white keys: 52 white keys for the notes of the C major scale (C, D, E, F, G, A and B) and 36 shorter black keys raised above the white keys and set further back, for sharps and flats. This means that the piano can play 88 different pitches (or "notes"), spanning a range of a bit over seven octaves. The black keys are for the "accidentals" (F/G, G/A, A/B, C/D, and D/E), which are needed to play in all twelve keys. More rarely, some pianos have additional keys (which require additional strings), an example of which is the Bösendorfer Concert Grand 290 Imperial, which has 97 keys.

During the 1800s, influenced by the musical trends of the Romantic music era, innovations such as the cast iron frame (which allowed much greater string tensions) and aliquot stringing gave grand pianos a more powerful sound, with a longer sustain and richer tone. In the nineteenth century, a family's piano played the same role that a radio or phonograph played in the twentieth century; when a nineteenth-century family wanted to hear a newly published musical piece or symphony, they could hear it by having a family member play a simplified version on the piano. During the nineteenth century, music publishers produced many types of musical works (symphonies, opera overtures, waltzes, etc.) in arrangements for piano, so that music lovers could play and hear the popular pieces of the day in their home. The piano is widely employed in classical, jazz, traditional and popular music for solo and ensemble performances, accompaniment, and for composing, songwriting and rehearsals. Although the piano is very heavy and thus not portable and is expensive, its musical versatility, the large number of musicians –both amateurs and professionals– trained in it, and its wide availability in performance venues, schools and rehearsal spaces have made it one of the Western world's most familiar musical instruments.

History

The piano was founded on earlier technological innovations in keyboard instruments. Pipe organs have been used since antiquity, and as such, the development of pipe organs enabled instrument builders to learn about creating keyboard mechanisms for sounding pitches. The first string instruments with struck strings were the hammered dulcimers, which were used since the Middle Ages in Europe. During the Middle Ages, there were several attempts at creating stringed keyboard instruments with struck strings. By the 17th century, the mechanisms of keyboard instruments such as the clavichord and the harpsichord were well developed. In a clavichord, the strings are struck by tangents, while in a harpsichord, they are mechanically plucked by quills when the performer depresses the key. Centuries of work on the mechanism of the harpsichord in particular had shown instrument builders the most effective ways to construct the case, soundboard, bridge, and mechanical action for a keyboard intended to sound strings.

Invention

The invention of the piano is credited to Bartolomeo Cristofori (1655–1731) of Padua, Italy, who was employed by Ferdinando de' Medici, Grand Prince of Tuscany, as the Keeper of the Instruments. Cristofori was an expert harpsichord maker, and was well acquainted with the body of knowledge on stringed keyboard instruments; this knowledge of keyboard mechanisms and actions helped him to develop the first pianos. It is not known exactly when Cristofori first built a piano. An inventory made by his employers, the Medici family, indicates the existence of a piano by the year 1700. The three Cristofori pianos that survive today date from the 1720s. Cristofori named the instrument un cimbalo di cipresso di piano e forte ("a keyboard of cypress with soft and loud"), abbreviated over time as pianoforte, fortepiano, and later, simply, piano.

Cristofori's great success was designing a stringed keyboard instrument in which the notes are struck by a hammer. The hammer must strike the string, but not remain in contact with it, because continued contact would damp the sound and stop the string from vibrating and making sound. This means that after striking the string, the hammer must quickly fall from (or rebound from) the strings. Moreover, the hammer must return to its rest position without bouncing violently (thus preventing notes from being re-played by accidental rebound), and it must return to a position in which it is ready to play again almost immediately after its key is depressed, so the player can repeat the same note rapidly when desired. Cristofori's piano action was a model for the many approaches to piano actions that followed in the next century.

Cristofori's early instruments were made with thin strings, and were much quieter than the modern piano, but they were much louder and with more sustain in comparison to the clavichord—the only previous keyboard instrument capable of dynamic nuance responding to the player's touch, the velocity with which the keys are pressed. While the clavichord allows expressive control of volume and sustain, it is relatively quiet even at its loudest. The harpsichord produces a sufficiently loud sound, especially when a coupler joins each key to both manuals of a two-manual harpsichord, but it offers no dynamic or expressive control over individual notes. The piano in some sense offers the best of both of the older instruments, combining the ability to play at least as loudly as a harpsichord with the ability to continuously vary dynamics by touch.

Early fortepiano

Cristofori's new instrument remained relatively unknown until an Italian writer, Scipione Maffei, wrote an enthusiastic article about it in 1711, including a diagram of the mechanism, that was translated into German and widely distributed. Most of the next generation of piano builders started their work based on reading this article. One of these builders was Gottfried Silbermann, better known as an organ builder. Silbermann's pianos were virtually direct copies of Cristofori's, with one important addition: Silbermann invented the forerunner of the modern sustain pedal, which lifts all the dampers from the strings simultaneously. This innovation allows the pianist to sustain the notes that they have depressed even after their fingers are no longer pressing down the keys. As such, by holding a chord with the sustain pedal, pianists can relocate their hands to a different register of the keyboard in preparation for a subsequent section.

Silbermann showed Johann Sebastian Bach one of his early instruments in the 1730s, but Bach did not like the instrument at that time, saying that the higher notes were too soft to allow a full dynamic range. Although this earned him some animosity from Silbermann, the criticism was apparently heeded. Bach did approve of a later instrument he saw in 1747, and even served as an agent in selling Silbermann's pianos. "Instrument: piano et forte genandt"—a reference to the instrument's ability to play soft and loud—was an expression that Bach used to help sell the instrument when he was acting as Silbermann's agent in 1749.

Piano making flourished during the late 18th century in the Viennese school, which included Johann Andreas Stein (who worked in Augsburg, Germany) and the Viennese makers Nannette Streicher (daughter of Stein) and Anton Walter. Viennese-style pianos were built with wood frames, two strings per note, and leather-covered hammers. Some of these Viennese pianos had the opposite coloring of modern-day pianos; the natural keys were black and the accidental keys white. It was for such instruments that Wolfgang Amadeus Mozart composed his concertos and sonatas, and replicas of them are built in the 21st century for use in authentic-instrument performance of his music. The pianos of Mozart's day had a softer tone than 21st century pianos or English pianos, with less sustaining power. The term fortepiano now distinguishes these early instruments (and modern re-creations) from later pianos.

Modern piano

In the period from about 1790 to 1860, the Mozart-era piano underwent tremendous changes that led to the modern structure of the instrument. This revolution was in response to a preference by composers and pianists for a more powerful, sustained piano sound, and made possible by the ongoing Industrial Revolution with resources such as high-quality piano wire for strings, and precision casting for the production of massive iron frames that could withstand the tremendous tension of the strings. Over time, the tonal range of the piano was also increased from the five octaves of Mozart's day to the seven octave (or more) range found on today's pianos.

Early technological progress in the late 1700s owed much to the firm of Broadwood. John Broadwood joined with another Scot, Robert Stodart, and a Dutchman, Americus Backers, to design a piano in the harpsichord case—the origin of the "grand". This was achieved by about 1777. They quickly gained a reputation for the splendour and powerful tone of their instruments, with Broadwood constructing pianos that were progressively larger, louder, and more robustly constructed. They sent pianos to both Joseph Haydn and Ludwig van Beethoven, and were the first firm to build pianos with a range of more than five octaves: five octaves and a fifth during the 1790s, six octaves by 1810 (Beethoven used the extra notes in his later works), and seven octaves by 1820. The Viennese makers similarly followed these trends; however the two schools used different piano actions: Broadwoods used a more robust action, whereas Viennese instruments were more sensitive.

By the 1820s, the center of piano innovation had shifted to Paris, where the Pleyel firm manufactured pianos used by Frédéric Chopin and the Érard firm manufactured those used by Franz Liszt. In 1821, Sébastien Érard invented the double escapement action, which incorporated a repetition lever (also called the balancier) that permitted repeating a note even if the key had not yet risen to its maximum vertical position. This facilitated rapid playing of repeated notes, a musical device exploited by Liszt. When the invention became public, as revised by Henri Herz, the double escapement action gradually became standard in grand pianos, and is still incorporated into all grand pianos currently produced in the 2000s. Other improvements of the mechanism included the use of firm felt hammer coverings instead of layered leather or cotton. Felt, which Jean-Henri Pape was the first to use in pianos in 1826, was a more consistent material, permitting wider dynamic ranges as hammer weights and string tension increased. The sostenuto pedal (see below), invented in 1844 by Jean-Louis Boisselot and copied by the Steinway firm in 1874, allowed a wider range of effects.

One innovation that helped create the powerful sound of the modern piano was the use of a massive, strong, cast iron frame. Also called the "plate", the iron frame sits atop the soundboard, and serves as the primary bulwark against the force of string tension that can exceed 20 tons in a modern grand piano. The single piece cast iron frame was patented in 1825 in Boston by Alpheus Babcock, combining the metal hitch pin plate (1821, claimed by Broadwood on behalf of Samuel Hervé) and resisting bars (Thom and Allen, 1820, but also claimed by Broadwood and Érard). Babcock later worked for the Chickering & Mackays firm who patented the first full iron frame for grand pianos in 1843. Composite forged metal frames were preferred by many European makers until the American system was fully adopted by the early 20th century. The increased structural integrity of the iron frame allowed the use of thicker, tenser, and more numerous strings. In 1834, the Webster & Horsfal firm of Birmingham brought out a form of piano wire made from cast steel; it was "so superior to the iron wire that the English firm soon had a monopoly." But a better steel wire was soon created in 1840 by the Viennese firm of Martin Miller, and a period of innovation and intense competition ensued, with rival brands of piano wire being tested against one another at international competitions, leading ultimately to the modern form of piano wire.

Several important advances included changes to the way the piano was strung. The use of a "choir" of three strings, rather than two for all but the lowest notes, enhanced the richness and complexity of the treble. The use of a Capo d’Astro bar instead of agraffes in the uppermost treble allowed the hammers to strike the strings in their optimal position, greatly increasing that area's power. The implementation of over-stringing (also called cross-stringing), in which the strings are placed in two separate planes, each with its own bridge height, allowed greater length to the bass strings and optimized the transition from unwound tenor strings to the iron or copper-wound bass strings. Over-stringing was invented by Pape during the 1820s, and first patented for use in grand pianos in the United States by Henry Steinway Jr. in 1859.

Some piano makers added variations to enhance the tone of each note, such as Pascal Taskin (1788), Collard & Collard (1821), and Julius Blüthner, who developed Aliquot stringing in 1893. These systems were used to strengthen the tone of the highest register of notes on the piano, which up until this time were viewed as being too weak-sounding. Each used more distinctly ringing, undamped vibrations of sympathetically vibrating strings to add to the tone, except the Blüthner Aliquot stringing, which uses an additional fourth string in the upper two treble sections. While the hitchpins of these separately suspended Aliquot strings are raised slightly above the level of the usual tri-choir strings, they are not struck by the hammers but rather are damped by attachments of the usual dampers. Eager to copy these effects, Theodore Steinway invented duplex scaling, which used short lengths of non-speaking wire bridged by the "aliquot" throughout much of the upper range of the piano, always in locations that caused them to vibrate sympathetically in conformity with their respective overtones—typically in doubled octaves and twelfths.

Variations in shape and design
Some early pianos had shapes and designs that are no longer in use. The square piano (not truly square, but rectangular) was cross strung at an extremely acute angle above the hammers, with the keyboard set along the long side. This design is attributed to Christian Ernst Friderici, a pupil of Gottfried Silbermann, in Germany, and Johannes Zumpe in England, and it was improved by changes first introduced by Guillaume-Lebrecht Petzold in France and Alpheus Babcock in the United States. Square pianos were built in great numbers through the 1840s in Europe and the 1890s in the United States, and saw the most visible change of any type of piano: the iron-framed, over-strung squares manufactured by Steinway & Sons were more than two-and-a-half times the size of Zumpe's wood-framed instruments from a century before. Their overwhelming popularity was due to inexpensive construction and price, although their tone and performance were limited by narrow soundboards, simple actions and string spacing that made proper hammer alignment difficult.

The tall, vertically strung upright grand was arranged like a grand set on end, with the soundboard and bridges above the keys, and tuning pins below them. "Giraffe pianos", "pyramid pianos" and "lyre pianos" were arranged in a somewhat similar fashion, using evocatively shaped cases. The very tall cabinet piano was introduced about 1805 and was built through the 1840s. It had strings arranged vertically on a continuous frame with bridges extended nearly to the floor, behind the keyboard and very large sticker action. The short cottage upright or pianino with vertical stringing, made popular by Robert Wornum around 1815, was built into the 20th century. They are informally called birdcage pianos because of their prominent damper mechanism. The oblique upright, popularized in France by Roller & Blanchet during the late 1820s, was diagonally strung throughout its compass. The tiny spinet upright was manufactured from the mid-1930s until recent times. The low position of the hammers required the use of a "drop action" to preserve a reasonable keyboard height. Modern upright and grand pianos attained their present, 2000-era forms by the end of the 19th century. While improvements have been made in manufacturing processes, and many individual details of the instrument continue to receive attention, and a small number of acoustic pianos in the 2010s are produced with MIDI recording and digital sound module-triggering capabilities, the 19th century was the era of the most dramatic innovations and modifications of the instrument.

Types
Modern pianos have two basic configurations, the grand piano and the upright piano, with various styles of each. There are also specialized and novelty pianos, electric pianos based on electromechanical designs, electronic pianos that synthesize piano-like tones using oscillators, and digital pianos using digital samples of acoustic piano sounds.

Grand 

In grand pianos the frame and strings are horizontal, with the strings extending away from the keyboard. The action lies beneath the strings, and uses gravity as its means of return to a state of rest. Some of the lengths have been given more-or-less customary names, which vary from time to time and place to place, but might include:

 Baby grand – around 
 Parlor grand or boudoir grand – 
 Concert grand – between )

All else being equal, longer pianos with longer strings have larger, richer sound and lower inharmonicity of the strings. Inharmonicity is the degree to which the frequencies of overtones (known as partials or harmonics) sound sharp relative to whole multiples of the fundamental frequency. This results from the piano's considerable string stiffness; as a struck string decays its harmonics vibrate, not from their termination, but from a point very slightly toward the center (or more flexible part) of the string. The higher the partial, the further sharp it runs. Pianos with shorter and thicker string (i.e., small pianos with short string scales) have more inharmonicity. The greater the inharmonicity, the more the ear perceives it as harshness of tone.

The inharmonicity of piano strings requires that octaves be stretched, or tuned to a lower octave's corresponding sharp overtone rather than to a theoretically correct octave. If octaves are not stretched, single octaves sound in tune, but double—and notably triple—octaves are unacceptably narrow. Stretching a small piano's octaves to match its inherent inharmonicity level creates an imbalance among all the instrument's intervallic relationships. In a concert grand, however, the octave "stretch" retains harmonic balance, even when aligning treble notes to a harmonic produced from three octaves below. This lets close and widespread octaves sound pure, and produces virtually beatless perfect fifths. This gives the concert grand a brilliant, singing and sustaining tone quality—one of the principal reasons that full-size grands are used in the concert hall. Smaller grands satisfy the space and cost needs of domestic use; as well, they are used in some small teaching studios and smaller performance venues.

Upright

Upright pianos, also called vertical pianos, are more compact due to the vertical structure of the frame and strings. The mechanical action structure of the upright piano was invented in London, England in 1826 by Robert Wornum, and upright models became the most popular model for domestic use. Upright pianos took less space than a grand piano, and as such they were a better size for use in private homes for domestic music-making and practice. The hammers move horizontally, and return to their resting position via springs, which are susceptible to degradation. Upright pianos with unusually tall frames and long strings were sometimes marketed as upright grand pianos, but that label is misleading. Some authors classify modern pianos according to their height and to modifications of the action that are necessary to accommodate the height. Upright pianos are generally less expensive than grand pianos. Upright pianos are widely used in churches, community centers, schools, music conservatories and university music programs as rehearsal and practice instruments, and they are popular models for in-home purchase.

 The top of a spinet model barely rises above the keyboard. Unlike all other pianos, the spinet action is located below the keys, operated by vertical wires that are attached to the backs of the keys. 
 Console pianos, which have a compact action (shorter hammers than a large upright has), but because the console's action is above the keys rather than below them as in a spinet, a console almost always plays better than a spinet does. Console pianos are a few inches shorter than studio models.
This is the shortest cabinet that can accommodate a full-sized action located above the keyboard.
 Anything taller than a studio piano is called an upright. (Technically, any piano with a vertically oriented soundboard could be called an upright, but that word is often reserved for the full-size models.)

Specialized

The toy piano, introduced in the 19th century, is a small piano-like instrument, that generally uses round metal rods to produce sound, rather than strings. The US Library of Congress recognizes the toy piano as a unique instrument with the subject designation, Toy Piano Scores: M175 T69.

In 1863, Henri Fourneaux invented the player piano, which plays itself from a piano roll. A machine perforates a performance recording into rolls of paper, and the player piano replays the performance using pneumatic devices. Modern equivalents of the player piano include the Bösendorfer CEUS, Yamaha Disklavier and QRS Pianomation, using solenoids and MIDI rather than pneumatics and rolls.

A silent piano is an acoustic piano having an option to silence the strings by means of an interposing hammer bar. They are designed for private silent practice, to avoid disturbing others.

Edward Ryley invented the transposing piano in 1801. This rare instrument has a lever under the keyboard to move the keyboard relative to the strings, so a pianist can play in a familiar key while the music sounds in a different key.

The minipiano is an instrument patented by the Brasted brothers of the Eavestaff Ltd. piano company in 1934. This instrument has a braceless back and a soundboard positioned below the keys—long metal rods pull on the levers to make the hammers strike the strings. The first model, known as the Pianette, was unique in that the tuning pins extended through the instrument, so it could be tuned at the front.

The prepared piano, present in some contemporary art music from the 20th and 21st century is a piano which has objects placed inside it to alter its sound, or has had its mechanism changed in some other way. The scores for music for prepared piano specify the modifications, for example, instructing the pianist to insert pieces of rubber, paper, metal screws, or washers in between the strings. These objects mute the strings or alter their timbre.

The pedal piano is a rare type of piano that has a pedal keyboard at the base, designed to be played by the feet. The pedals may play the existing bass strings on the piano, or rarely, the pedals may have their own set of bass strings and hammer mechanisms. While the typical intended use for pedal pianos is to enable a keyboardist to practice pipe organ music at home, a few players of pedal piano use it as a performance instrument.

Wadia Sabra had a microtone piano manufactured by Pleyel in 1920. Abdallah Chahine later constructed his quartertone "Oriental piano" with the help of Austrian Hofmann.

Electric, electronic, and digital

With technological advances, amplified electric pianos (1929), electronic pianos (1970s), and digital pianos (1980s) have been developed. The electric piano became a popular instrument in the 1960s and 1970s genres of jazz fusion, funk music and rock music. The first electric pianos from the late 1920s used metal strings with a magnetic pickup, an amplifier and a loudspeaker. The electric pianos that became most popular in pop and rock music in the 1960s and 1970s, such as the Fender Rhodes use metal tines in place of strings and use electromagnetic pickups similar to those on an electric guitar. The resulting electrical, analogue signal can then be amplified with a keyboard amplifier or electronically manipulated with effects units. In classical music, electric pianos are mainly used as inexpensive rehearsal or practice instruments. However, electric pianos, particularly the Fender Rhodes, became important instruments in 1970s funk and jazz fusion and in some rock music genres.

Electronic pianos are non-acoustic; they do not have strings, tines or hammers, but are a type of analog synthesizer that simulates or imitates piano sounds using oscillators and filters that synthesize the sound of an acoustic piano. They must be connected to a keyboard amplifier and speaker to produce sound (however, some electronic keyboards have a built-in amp and speaker). Alternatively, a person can play an electronic piano with headphones in quieter settings.

Digital pianos are also non-acoustic and do not have strings or hammers. They use digital audio sampling technology to reproduce the acoustic sound of each piano note accurately. They also must be connected to a power amplifier and speaker to produce sound (however, most digital pianos have a built-in amp and speaker). Alternatively, a person can practise with headphones to avoid disturbing others. Digital pianos can include sustain pedals, weighted or semi-weighted keys, multiple voice options (e.g., sampled or synthesized imitations of electric piano, Hammond organ, violin, etc.), and MIDI interfaces. MIDI inputs and outputs connect a digital piano to other electronic instruments or musical devices. For example, a digital piano's MIDI out signal could be connected by a patch cord to a synth module, which would allow the performer to use the keyboard of the digital piano to play modern synthesizer sounds. Early digital pianos tended to lack a full set of pedals but the synthesis software of later models such as the Yamaha Clavinova series synthesised the sympathetic vibration of the other strings (such as when the sustain pedal is depressed) and full pedal sets can now be replicated. The processing power of digital pianos has enabled highly realistic pianos using multi-gigabyte piano sample sets with as many as ninety recordings, each lasting many seconds, for each key under different conditions (e.g., there are samples of each note being struck softly, loudly, with a sharp attack, etc.). Additional samples emulate sympathetic resonance of the strings when the sustain pedal is depressed, key release, the drop of the dampers, and simulations of techniques such as re-pedalling.

Digital, MIDI-equipped pianos can output a stream of MIDI data, or record and play via a CD ROM or USB flash drive using MIDI format files, similar in concept to a pianola. The MIDI file records the physics of a note rather than its resulting sound and recreates the sounds from its physical properties (e.g., which note was struck and with what velocity). Computer based software, such as Modartt's 2006 Pianoteq, can be used to manipulate the MIDI stream in real time or subsequently to edit it. This type of software may use no samples but synthesize a sound based on aspects of the physics that went into the creation of a played note.

Hybrid instruments

In the 2000s, some pianos include an acoustic grand piano or upright piano combined with MIDI electronic features. Such a piano can be played acoustically, or the keyboard can be used as a MIDI controller, which can trigger a synthesizer module or music sampler. Some electronic feature-equipped pianos such as the Yamaha Disklavier electronic player piano, introduced in 1987, are outfitted with electronic sensors for recording and electromechanical solenoids for player piano-style playback. Sensors record the movements of the keys, hammers, and pedals during a performance, and the system saves the performance data as a Standard MIDI File (SMF). On playback, the solenoids move the keys and pedals and thus reproduce the original performance. Modern Disklaviers typically include an array of electronic features, such as a built-in tone generator for playing back MIDI accompaniment tracks, speakers, MIDI connectivity that supports communication with computing devices and external MIDI instruments, additional ports for audio and SMPTE input/output (I/O), and Internet connectivity. Disklaviers have been manufactured in the form of upright, baby grand, and grand piano styles (including a nine-foot concert grand). Reproducing systems have ranged from relatively simple, playback-only models to professional models that can record performance data at resolutions that exceed the limits of normal MIDI data. The unit mounted under the keyboard of the piano can play MIDI or audio software on its CD.

Construction and components

Pianos can have over 12,000 individual parts, supporting six functional features: keyboard, hammers, dampers, bridge, soundboard, and strings. Many parts of a piano are made of materials selected for strength and longevity. This is especially true of the outer rim. It is most commonly made of hardwood, typically hard maple or beech, and its massiveness serves as an essentially immobile object from which the flexible soundboard can best vibrate. According to Harold A. Conklin, the purpose of a sturdy rim is so that, "... the vibrational energy will stay as much as possible in the soundboard instead of dissipating uselessly in the case parts, which are inefficient radiators of sound."

Hardwood rims are commonly made by laminating thin, hence flexible, strips of hardwood, bending them to the desired shape immediately after the application of glue. The bent plywood system was developed by C.F. Theodore Steinway in 1880 to reduce manufacturing time and costs. Previously, the rim was constructed from several pieces of solid wood, joined and veneered, and European makers used this method well into the 20th century. A modern exception, Bösendorfer, the Austrian manufacturer of high-quality pianos, constructs their inner rims from solid spruce, the same wood that the soundboard is made from, which is notched to allow it to bend; rather than isolating the rim from vibration, their "resonance case principle" allows the framework to resonate more freely with the soundboard, creating additional coloration and complexity of the overall sound.

The thick wooden posts on the underside (grands) or back (uprights) of the piano stabilize the rim structure, and are made of softwood for stability. The requirement of structural strength, fulfilled by stout hardwood and thick metal, makes a piano heavy. Even a small upright can weigh , and the Steinway concert grand (Model D) weighs . The largest piano available on the general market, the Fazioli F308, weighs .

The pinblock, which holds the tuning pins in place, is another area where toughness is important. It is made of hardwood (typically hard maple or beech), and is laminated for strength, stability and longevity. Piano strings (also called piano wire), which must endure years of extreme tension and hard blows, are made of high carbon steel. They are manufactured to vary as little as possible in diameter, since all deviations from uniformity introduce tonal distortion. The bass strings of a piano are made of a steel core wrapped with copper wire, to increase their mass whilst retaining flexibility. If all strings throughout the piano's compass were individual (monochord), the massive bass strings would overpower the upper ranges. Makers compensate for this with the use of double (bichord) strings in the tenor and triple (trichord) strings throughout the treble.

The plate (harp), or metal frame, of a piano is usually made of cast iron. A massive plate is advantageous. Since the strings vibrate from the plate at both ends, an insufficiently massive plate would absorb too much of the vibrational energy that should go through the bridge to the soundboard. While some manufacturers use cast steel in their plates, most prefer cast iron. Cast iron is easy to cast and machine, has flexibility sufficient for piano use, is much more resistant to deformation than steel, and is especially tolerant of compression. Plate casting is an art, since dimensions are crucial and the iron shrinks about one percent during cooling. Including an extremely large piece of metal in a piano is potentially an aesthetic handicap. Piano makers overcome this by polishing, painting, and decorating the plate. Plates often include the manufacturer's ornamental medallion. In an effort to make pianos lighter, Alcoa worked with Winter and Company piano manufacturers to make pianos using an aluminum plate during the 1940s. Aluminum piano plates were not widely accepted, and were discontinued.

The numerous parts of a piano action are generally made from hardwood, such as maple, beech, and hornbeam; however, since World War II, makers have also incorporated plastics. Early plastics used in some pianos in the late 1940s and 1950s, proved disastrous when they lost strength after a few decades of use. Beginning in 1961, the New York branch of the Steinway firm incorporated Teflon, a synthetic material developed by DuPont, for some parts of its Permafree grand action in place of cloth bushings, but abandoned the experiment in 1982 due to excessive friction and a "clicking" that developed over time; Teflon is "humidity stable" whereas the wood adjacent to the Teflon swells and shrinks with humidity changes, causing problems. More recently, the Kawai firm built pianos with action parts made of more modern materials such as carbon fiber reinforced plastic, and the piano parts manufacturer Wessell, Nickel and Gross has launched a new line of carefully engineered composite parts. Thus far these parts have performed reasonably, but it will take decades to know if they equal the longevity of wood.

In all but the lowest quality pianos the soundboard is made of solid spruce (that is, spruce boards glued together along the side grain). Spruce's high ratio of strength to weight minimizes acoustic impedance while offering strength sufficient to withstand the downward force of the strings. The best piano makers use quarter-sawn, defect-free spruce of close annular grain, carefully seasoning it over a long period before fabricating the soundboards. This is the identical material that is used in quality acoustic guitar soundboards. Cheap pianos often have plywood soundboards.

The design of the piano hammers requires having the hammer felt be soft enough so that it will not create loud, very high harmonics that a hard hammer will cause. The hammer must be lightweight enough to move swiftly when a key is pressed; yet at the same time, it must be strong enough so that it can hit strings hard when the player strikes the keys forcefully for fortissimo playing or sforzando accents.

Keyboard

In the early years of piano construction, keys were commonly made from sugar pine. In the 2010s, they are usually made of spruce or basswood. Spruce is typically used in high-quality pianos. Black keys were traditionally made of ebony, and the white keys were covered with strips of ivory. However, since ivory-yielding species are now endangered and protected by treaty, or are illegal in some countries, makers use plastics almost exclusively. Also, ivory tends to chip more easily than plastic. Legal ivory can still be obtained in limited quantities. Yamaha developed a plastic called Ivorite intended to mimic the look and feel of ivory; other manufacturers have done likewise.

Almost every modern piano has 52 white keys and 36 black keys for a total of 88 keys (seven octaves plus a minor third, from A0 to C8). Many older pianos only have 85 keys (seven octaves from A0 to A7). Some piano manufacturers have extended the range further in one or both directions. For example, the Imperial Bösendorfer has nine extra keys at the bass end, giving a total of 97 keys and an eight octave range. These extra keys are sometimes hidden under a small hinged lid that can cover the keys to prevent visual disorientation for pianists unfamiliar with the extra keys, or the colours of the extra white keys are reversed (black instead of white). More recently, Australian manufacturer Stuart & Sons created a piano with 108 keys, going from C0 to B8, covering nine full octaves. The extra keys are the same as the other keys in appearance.

The extra keys are added primarily for increased resonance from the associated strings; that is, they vibrate sympathetically with other strings whenever the damper pedal is depressed and thus give a fuller tone. Only a very small number of works composed for piano actually use these notes.

Toy piano company Schoenhut manufactures grands and uprights with only 44 or 49 keys and a shorter distance between the keyboard and the pedals. These are true pianos with working mechanisms and strings.

A rare variant of the piano called the Emánuel Moór Pianoforte has double keyboards, one lying above the other. It was invented by Hungarian composer and pianist, Emánuel Moór (19 February 1863 – 20 October 1931). The lower keyboard has the usual 88 keys, whilst the upper keyboard has 76 keys. When the upper keyboard is played, an internal mechanism pulls down the corresponding key on the lower keyboard, but an octave higher. This lets a pianist reach two octaves with one hand, impossible on a conventional piano. Due to its double keyboard, musical works that were originally created for double-manual harpsichord, such as the Goldberg Variations by Bach, become much easier to play, since playing on a conventional single keyboard piano involves complex and hand-tangling cross-hand movements. The design also features a special fourth pedal that couples the lower and upper keyboard, so when playing on the lower keyboard the note one octave higher also plays. Only about 60 Emánuel Moór Pianofortes were made, mostly by Bösendorfer. Other piano manufacturers, such as Bechstein, Chickering, and Steinway & Sons, also manufactured a few.

Pianos have been built with alternative keyboard systems, e.g., the Jankó keyboard.

Pedals

Pianos have had pedals, or some close equivalent, since the earliest days. (In the 18th century, some pianos used levers pressed upward by the player's knee instead of pedals.) Most grand pianos in the US have three pedals: the soft pedal (una corda), sostenuto, and sustain pedal (from left to right, respectively), while in Europe, the standard is two pedals: the soft pedal and the sustain pedal. Most modern upright pianos also have three pedals: soft pedal, practice pedal and sustain pedal, though older or cheaper models may lack the practice pedal. In Europe the standard for upright pianos is two pedals: the soft and the sustain pedals.

The sustain pedal (or, damper pedal) is often simply called "the pedal", since it is the most frequently used. It is placed as the rightmost pedal in the group. It lifts the dampers from all keys, sustaining all played notes. In addition, it alters the overall tone by allowing all strings, including those not directly played, to reverberate. When all of the other strings on the piano can vibrate, this allows sympathetic vibration of strings that are harmonically related to the sounded pitches. For example, if the pianist plays the 440 Hz "A" note, the higher octave "A" notes will also sound sympathetically.

The soft pedal or una corda pedal is placed leftmost in the row of pedals. In grand pianos it shifts the entire action/keyboard assembly to the right (a very few instruments have shifted left) so that the hammers hit two of the three strings for each note. In the earliest pianos whose unisons were bichords rather than trichords, the action shifted so that hammers hit a single string, hence the name una corda, or 'one string'. The effect is to soften the note as well as change the tone. In uprights this action is not possible; instead the pedal moves the hammers closer to the strings, allowing the hammers to strike with less kinetic energy. This produces a slightly softer sound, but no change in timbre.

On grand pianos, the middle pedal is a sostenuto pedal. This pedal keeps raised any damper already raised at the moment the pedal is depressed. This makes it possible to sustain selected notes (by depressing the sostenuto pedal before those notes are released) while the player's hands are free to play additional notes (which don't sustain). This can be useful for musical passages with low bass pedal points, in which a bass note is sustained while a series of chords changes over top of it, and other otherwise tricky parts. On many upright pianos, the middle pedal is called the "practice" or celeste pedal. This drops a piece of felt between the hammers and strings, greatly muting the sounds. This pedal can be shifted while depressed, into a "locking" position.

There are also non-standard variants. On some pianos (grands and verticals), the middle pedal can be a bass sustain pedal: that is, when it is depressed, the dampers lift off the strings only in the bass section. Players use this pedal to sustain a single bass note or chord over many measures, while playing the melody in the treble section.

The rare transposing piano (an example of which was owned by Irving Berlin) has a middle pedal that functions as a clutch that disengages the keyboard from the mechanism, so the player can move the keyboard to the left or right with a lever. This shifts the entire piano action so the pianist can play music written in one key so that it sounds in a different key.

Some piano companies have included extra pedals other than the standard two or three. On the Stuart and Sons pianos as well as the largest Fazioli piano, there is a fourth pedal to the left of the principal three. This fourth pedal works in the same way as the soft pedal of an upright piano, moving the hammers closer to the strings. 
The Crown and Schubert Piano Company also produced a four-pedal piano.

Wing and Son of New York offered a five-pedal piano from approximately 1893 through the 1920s. There is no mention of the company past the 1930s. Labeled left to right, the pedals are Mandolin, Orchestra, Expression, Soft, and Forte (Sustain). The Orchestral pedal produced a sound similar to a tremolo feel by bouncing a set of small beads dangling against the strings, enabling the piano to mimic a mandolin, guitar, banjo, zither and harp, thus the name Orchestral. The Mandolin pedal used a similar approach, lowering a set of felt strips with metal rings in between the hammers and the strings (aka rinky-tink effect). This extended the life of the hammers when the Orch pedal was used, a good idea for practicing, and created an echo-like sound that mimicked playing in an orchestral hall.

The pedalier piano, or pedal piano, is a rare type of piano that includes a pedalboard so players can use their feet to play bass register notes, as on an organ. There are two types of pedal piano. On one, the pedal board is an integral part of the instrument, using the same strings and mechanism as the manual keyboard. The other, rarer type, consists of two independent pianos (each with separate mechanics and strings) placed one above the other—one for the hands and one for the feet. This was developed primarily as a practice instrument for organists, though there is a small repertoire written specifically for the instrument.

Mechanics

When the key is struck, a chain reaction occurs to produce the sound. First, the key raises the "wippen" mechanism, which forces the jack against the hammer roller (or knuckle). The hammer roller then lifts the lever carrying the hammer. The key also raises the damper; and immediately after the hammer strikes the wire it falls back, allowing the wire to resonate and thus produce sound. When the key is released the damper falls back onto the strings, stopping the wire from vibrating, and thus stopping the sound. The vibrating piano strings themselves are not very loud, but their vibrations are transmitted to a large soundboard that moves air and thus converts the energy to sound. The irregular shape and off-center placement of the bridge ensure that the soundboard vibrates strongly at all frequencies. The raised damper allows the note to sound until the key (or sustain pedal) is released.

There are three factors that influence the pitch of a vibrating wire.
 Length: All other factors the same, the shorter the wire, the higher the pitch.
 Mass per unit length: All other factors the same, the thinner the wire, the higher the pitch.
 Tension: All other factors the same, the tighter the wire, the higher the pitch.

A vibrating wire subdivides itself into many parts vibrating at the same time. Each part produces a pitch of its own, called a partial. A vibrating string has one fundamental and a series of partials. The purest combination of two pitches is when one is double the frequency of the other.

For a repeating wave, the velocity  equals the wavelength  times the frequency ,

On the piano string, waves reflect from both ends. The superposition of reflecting waves results in a standing wave pattern, but only for wavelengths , where  is the length of the string. Timbre is largely determined by the content of these harmonics. Different instruments have different harmonic content for the same pitch. A real string vibrates at harmonics that are not perfect multiples of the fundamental. This results in a little inharmonicity, which gives richness to the tone but causes significant tuning challenges throughout the compass of the instrument.

Striking the piano key with greater velocity increases the amplitude of the waves and therefore the volume. From pianissimo to fortissimo the hammer velocity changes by almost a factor of a hundred. If two wires adjusted to the same pitch are struck at the same time, the sound produced by one reinforces the other, and a louder combined sound of shorter duration is produced. If one wire vibrates out of synchronization with the other, they subtract from each other and produce a softer tone of longer duration.

Maintenance

Pianos are heavy and powerful, yet delicate instruments. Over the years, professional piano movers have developed special techniques for transporting both grands and uprights, which prevent damage to the case and to the piano's mechanical elements. Pianos need regular tuning to keep them on correct pitch. The hammers of pianos are voiced to compensate for gradual hardening of the felt, and other parts also need periodic regulation. Pianos need regular maintenance to ensure the felt hammers and key mechanisms are functioning properly. Aged and worn pianos can be rebuilt or reconditioned by piano rebuilders. Strings eventually must be replaced. Often, by replacing a great number of their parts, and adjusting them, old instruments can perform as well as new pianos.

Piano tuning involves adjusting the tensions of the piano's strings with a specialized wrench, thereby aligning the intervals among their tones so that the instrument is in tune. While guitar and violin players tune their own instruments, pianists usually hire a piano tuner, a specialized technician, to tune their pianos. The piano tuner uses special tools. The meaning of the term in tune in the context of piano tuning is not simply a particular fixed set of pitches. Fine piano tuning carefully assesses the interaction among all notes of the chromatic scale, different for every piano, and thus requires slightly different pitches from any theoretical standard. Pianos are usually tuned to a modified version of the system called equal temperament (see Piano key frequencies for the theoretical piano tuning). In all systems of tuning, each pitch is derived from its relationship to a chosen fixed pitch, usually the internationally recognized standard concert pitch of A4 (the A above middle C). The term A440 refers to a widely accepted frequency of this pitch – 440 Hz.

The relationship between two pitches, called an interval, is the ratio of their absolute frequencies. Two different intervals are perceived as the same when the pairs of pitches involved share the same frequency ratio. The easiest intervals to identify, and the easiest intervals to tune, are those that are just, meaning they have a simple whole-number ratio. The term temperament refers to a tuning system that tempers the just intervals (usually the perfect fifth, which has the ratio 3:2) to satisfy another mathematical property; in equal temperament, a fifth is tempered by narrowing it slightly, achieved by flattening its upper pitch slightly, or raising its lower pitch slightly. A temperament system is also known as a set of "bearings". Tempering an interval causes it to beat, which is a fluctuation in perceived sound intensity due to interference between close (but unequal) pitches. The rate of beating is equal to the frequency differences of any harmonics that are present for both pitches and that coincide or nearly coincide. Piano tuners have to use their ear to "stretch" the tuning of a piano to make it sound in tune. This involves tuning the highest-pitched strings slightly higher and the lowest-pitched strings slightly lower than what a mathematical frequency table (in which octaves are derived by doubling the frequency) would suggest.

Playing and technique

As with any other musical instrument, the piano may be played from written music, by ear, or through improvisation. While some folk and blues pianists were self-taught, in Classical and jazz, there are well-established piano teaching systems and institutions, including pre-college graded examinations, university, college and music conservatory diplomas and degrees, ranging from the B.Mus. and M.Mus. to the Doctor of Musical Arts in piano. Piano technique evolved during the transition from harpsichord and clavichord to fortepiano playing, and continued through the development of the modern piano. Changes in musical styles and audience preferences over the 19th and 20th century, as well as the emergence of virtuoso performers, contributed to this evolution and to the growth of distinct approaches or schools of piano playing. Although technique is often viewed as only the physical execution of a musical idea, many pedagogues and performers stress the interrelatedness of the physical and mental or emotional aspects of piano playing. Well-known approaches to piano technique include those by Dorothy Taubman, Edna Golandsky, Fred Karpoff, Charles-Louis Hanon and Otto Ortmann.

Performance styles
Many classical music composers, including Haydn, Mozart, and Beethoven, composed for the fortepiano, a rather different instrument than the modern piano. Even composers of the Romantic movement, like Franz Liszt, Frédéric Chopin, Clara and Robert Schumann, Fanny and Felix Mendelssohn, and Johannes Brahms, wrote for pianos substantially different from 2010-era modern pianos. Contemporary musicians may adjust their interpretation of historical compositions from the 1600s to the 1800s to account for sound quality differences between old and new instruments or to changing performance practice.

Starting in Beethoven's later career, the fortepiano evolved into an instrument more like the modern piano of the 2000s. Modern pianos were in wide use by the late 19th century. They featured an octave range larger than the earlier fortepiano instrument, adding around 30 more keys to the instrument, which extended the deep bass range and the high treble range. Factory mass production of upright pianos made them more affordable for a larger number of middle-class people. They appeared in music halls and pubs during the 19th century, providing entertainment through a piano soloist, or in combination with a small dance band. Just as harpsichordists had accompanied singers or dancers performing on stage, or playing for dances, pianists took up this role in the late 1700s and in the following centuries.

During the 19th century, American musicians playing for working-class audiences in small pubs and bars, particularly African-American composers, developed new musical genres based on the modern piano. Ragtime music, popularized by composers such as Scott Joplin, reached a broader audience by 1900. The popularity of ragtime music was quickly succeeded by Jazz piano. New techniques and rhythms were invented for the piano, including ostinato for boogie-woogie, and Shearing voicing. George Gershwin's Rhapsody in Blue broke new musical ground by combining American jazz piano with symphonic sounds. Comping, a technique for accompanying jazz vocalists on piano, was exemplified by Duke Ellington's technique. Honky-tonk music, featuring yet another style of piano rhythm, became popular during the same era. Bebop techniques grew out of jazz, with leading composer-pianists such as Thelonious Monk and Bud Powell. In the late 20th century, Bill Evans composed pieces combining classical techniques with his jazz experimentation. In the 1970s, Herbie Hancock was one of the first jazz composer-pianists to find mainstream popularity working with newer urban music techniques such as jazz-funk and jazz-rock.

Pianos have also been used prominently in rock and roll and rock music by performers such as Jerry Lee Lewis, Little Richard, Keith Emerson (Emerson, Lake & Palmer), Elton John, Ben Folds, Billy Joel, Nicky Hopkins, and Tori Amos, to name a few. Modernist styles of music have also appealed to composers writing for the modern grand piano, including John Cage and Philip Glass.

Role

The piano is a crucial instrument in Western classical music, jazz, blues, rock, folk music, and many other Western musical genres. Pianos are used in soloing or melodic roles and as accompaniment instruments. As well, pianos can be played alone, with a voice or other instrument, in small groups (bands and chamber music ensembles) and large ensembles (big band or orchestra). A large number of composers and songwriters are proficient pianists because the piano keyboard offers an effective means of experimenting with complex melodic and harmonic interplay of chords and trying out multiple, independent melody lines that are played at the same time. Pianos are used by composers doing film and television scoring, as the large range permits composers to try out melodies and bass lines, even if the music will be orchestrated for other instruments.

Bandleaders and choir conductors often learn the piano, as it is an excellent instrument for learning new pieces and songs to lead in performance. Many conductors are trained in piano, because it allows them to play parts of the symphonies they are conducting (using a piano reduction or doing a reduction from the full score), so that they can develop their interpretation. The piano is an essential tool in music education in elementary and secondary schools, and universities and colleges. Most music classrooms and many practice rooms have a piano. Pianos are used to help teach music theory, music history and music appreciation classes, and even non-pianist music professors or instructors may have a piano in their office.

See also 

 
 
 
 
 
 List of classical pianists
 List of films about pianists
 List of piano manufacturers
 List of piano brand names
 List of piano makers
 List of piano composers

Notes

References 

 
 
  Gives the basics of how pianos work, and a thorough evaluative survey of current pianos and their manufacturers. It also includes advice on buying and owning pianos.
  is a standard reference on the history of the piano.
  is an authoritative work covering the ancestry of the piano, its invention by Cristofori, and the early stages of its subsequent evolution.
  contains a wealth of information. Main article: Edwin M. Ripin, Stewart Pollens, Philip R. Belt, Maribel Meisel, Alfons Huber, Michael Cole, Gert Hecher, Beryl Kenyon de Pascual, Cynthia Adams Hoover, Cyril Ehrlich, Edwin M. Good, Robert Winter, and J. Bradford Robinson. "Pianoforte".

Further reading

External links

 History of the Piano Forte, Association of Blind Piano Tuners, UK
 Section Table of Music Pitches of the Virginia Tech Multimedia Music Dictionary
 The Frederick Historical Piano Collection
 The Pianofortes of Bartolomeo Cristofori, Heilbrunn Timeline of Art History, The Metropolitan Museum of Art
 Five lectures on the Acoustics of the piano
 The Piano in Polish Collections (historical instruments)

 
Articles containing video clips
Chordophones
Italian inventions
Keyboard instruments
European percussion instruments
Orchestral instruments
Rhythm section
C instruments
17th-century inventions
Italian musical instruments
String instruments